Raufoss IL is a sports club from Raufoss, Norway. The club was formed in 1918. The football section played in the Norwegian top flight between 1937–1948, between 1957–1960, in 1964 and between 1973–1974. The club currently plays in 1. divisjon, the second tier of the Norwegian football league system. Since 2015, they have played their home games at Nammo Stadion.

In 2007 Raufoss returned to the 1. divisjon and were able to finish in eleventh place, after being relegated from the second tier in 2004. However, due to financial problems and failure to meet demands on infrastructure, the Football Association of Norway decided not to award Raufoss the required license for play in the top two divisions. Raufoss were demoted to the 2. divisjon and their place given to Sparta Sarpsborg, who finished in thirteenth place.

Recent history 
{|class="wikitable"
|-bgcolor="#efefef"
! Season
! 
! Pos.
! Pl.
! W
! D
! L
! GS
! GA
! P
!Cup
!Notes
|-
|2006
|2. divisjon
|align=right bgcolor=#DDFFDD| 1
|align=right|26||align=right|17||align=right|6||align=right|3
|align=right|72||align=right|38||align=right|57
|Third round
|Promoted to the 1. divisjon
|-
|2007
|1. divisjon
|align=right bgcolor="#FFCCCC"| 11
|align=right|30||align=right|10||align=right|5||align=right|15
|align=right|37||align=right|61||align=right|35
|Second round
|Relegated to the 2. divisjon
|-
|2008
|2. divisjon
|align=right |4
|align=right|26||align=right|13||align=right|4||align=right|9
|align=right|55||align=right|37||align=right|43
||Second round
|
|-
|2009
|2. divisjon
|align=right |2
|align=right|26||align=right|16||align=right|2||align=right|8
|align=right|65||align=right|39||align=right|50
||Second round
|
|-
|2010
|2. divisjon
|align=right |4
|align=right|26||align=right|13||align=right|3||align=right|10
|align=right|41||align=right|38||align=right|42
||Second round
|
|-
|2011
|2. divisjon
|align=right |3
|align=right|24||align=right|13||align=right|3||align=right|8
|align=right|57||align=right|41||align=right|42
||First round
|
|-
|2012 
|2. divisjon
|align=right |2
|align=right|26||align=right|13||align=right|7||align=right|6
|align=right|54||align=right|26||align=right|46
||Third round
|
|-
|2013
|2. divisjon
|align=right |2
|align=right|26||align=right|16||align=right|3||align=right|7
|align=right|54||align=right|35||align=right|51
||Second round
|
|-
|2014 
|2. divisjon
|align=right |4
|align=right|26||align=right|15||align=right|5||align=right|6
|align=right|64||align=right|43||align=right|50
||Second round
|
|-
|2015 
|2. divisjon
|align=right bgcolor=#DDFFDD| 1
|align=right|26||align=right|20||align=right|4||align=right|2
|align=right|76||align=right|28||align=right|64
||Second round
|Promoted to the 1. divisjon
|-
|2016 
|1. divisjon
|align=right bgcolor="#FFCCCC"| 16
|align=right|30||align=right|6||align=right|3||align=right|21
|align=right|33||align=right|62||align=right|21
||First round
|Relegated to the 2. divisjon
|-
|2017
|2. divisjon
|align=right |2
|align=right|26||align=right|14||align=right|5||align=right|7
|align=right|53||align=right|28||align=right|47
||Second round
|
|-
|2018
|2. divisjon
|align=right bgcolor=#DDFFDD| 1
|align=right|26||align=right|16||align=right|5||align=right|5
|align=right|64||align=right|30||align=right|53
|Second round
|Promoted to the 1. divisjon
|-
|2019 
|1. divisjon
|align=right |11
|align=right|30||align=right|12||align=right|2||align=right|16
|align=right|47||align=right|59||align=right|38
|Second round
|
|-
|2020 
|1. divisjon
|align=right |6
|align=right|30||align=right|11||align=right|10||align=right|9
|align=right|53||align=right|44||align=right|42
|Cancelled
|
|-
|2021 
|1. divisjon
|align=right |11
|align=right|30||align=right|10||align=right|5||align=right|15
|align=right|51||align=right|54||align=right|34
|Fourth round
|
|-
|2022
|1. divisjon
|align=right |12
|align=right|30||align=right|9||align=right|8||align=right|13
|align=right|35||align=right|54||align=right|35
|First round
|
|-
|}
Source:

Current squad

Out on loan

Former players

Athletics
The club has an athletics section, with Olympic sprinter John Ertzgaard being the most prominent member.

References

External links

 Official website, football department
 Official website, athletics department 

 
Sports teams in Norway
Football clubs in Norway
Eliteserien clubs
Athletics clubs in Norway
1918 establishments in Norway
Association football clubs established in 1918